At least two ships of the Argentine Navy have been named República:

 , a gunboat commissioned in 1875.
 , an  launched in 1942 as USS Tact which served in the Royal Navy as HMS Smilax between 1943 and 1946.  Acquired by Argentina in 1946 and renamed. She was decommissioned in the 1960s.

Argentine Navy ship names